Family is a 2001 Dutch drama film directed by Willem van de Sande Bakhuyzen.

Cast 
 Petra Laseur - Els
 Marisa van Eyle - Bibi 
 Bram van der Vlugt - Jan
 Anneke Blok - Sandra
 Mark Rietman - Nico
  - Von
 R. Kan Albay - Theofanis Gekas

References

External links 

2001 drama films
2001 films
Dutch drama films
2000s Dutch-language films